Karsilamas (From ,) is a Turkish folk dance spread all over Northwest Turkey and carried to Greece by Anatolian Greek immigrants. The term "karşılama" means "encounter, welcoming, greeting" in Turkish.
The dance is popular in Northwestern areas of Turkey, especially on wedding parties and festivals.

In Greece and Cyprus there is a similar dance named, Antikrystos. Antikrystos, translates also, as "anti-face", i.e., face-to-face.

Karsilamas is a couple dance that is still danced in what was the Ottoman Empire, from Persia to Serbia, and in the Macedonia and Thrace regions of Northern Greece.

Figures of the dance may vary from region to region, but the main theme is two people face each other, and music rhythmically controls their next moves. Traditionally, people dance without any figure on their minds, just figures they have seen from their elders.

The style and mood (bouncy, smooth, lively, etc.) vary depending on the region.

Cyprus Antikrystos - Καρσιλαμαδες, Rumeli Balkan karsilamas, Thrace (Greece) Antikrystos, Merzifon Karsılaması, Edirne Karsılaması, Komotini (Greece) Karsilamas - Aptalikos, Giresun Karsılaması, Taraklı Karsılaması, Bilecik Karsılaması, Old Karsilamas (Παληός Καρσιλαμάς), Pigi Karsilama (Πιγκί), Ayşe Karsilama (İskender boğazı) (Αϊσέ) (Η Αγάπη Είναι Καρφίτσα), (Aptalikos Karsilamas (Απτάλικος), Asia Minor Karsilamas (Melinos karsilamas), Mastika.

Kanto
Kanto was heavily influenced by musical theatre, Balkan and Byzantine or Anatolian music (Karsilamas) (which was however often a subject of satire in kanto songs).

Köçekçe
(This latter meter is sometimes referred to as "gypsy 9".)

See also
Greece, Antikrystos
Greece, Kamilierikos
Aise
Entarisi ala benziyor
Suleiman Aga (dance)

References

External links

European folk dances
Balkan music
Bulgarian dances
Cypriot music
Serbian dances
Turkish folk dances
Turkish words and phrases
Pontic Greek dances
Greek dances